Piotr Zgorzelski (born 17 September 1963) is a Polish politician and teacher, who served as the head of the county of Płock from 2010 to 2011. He was elected to serve as an MP in the Sejm in 2011, re-elected in 2015 and 2019.

References 

Living people
1963 births
21st-century Polish politicians
Members of the Polish Sejm 2011–2015
Members of the Polish Sejm 2015–2019
Members of the Polish Sejm 2019–2023
Deputy Marshals of the Sejm of the Third Polish Republic